Bozburun is a seaside town of Turkey.

Bozburun may also refer to:
Bozburun Bay, a bay of Turkey
Bozburun Peninsula, a peninsula of Turkey
Bozburun, Aşkale